The Menard-Galaz House is a historic house in San Lorenzo, Grant County, New Mexico. It was built circa 1895 by John Menard, a homesteader. It was acquired by Manuel Galaz in 1908. The house was designed in the Vernacular New Mexico architectural style. It has been listed on the National Register of Historic Places since May 16, 1988.

It was listed on the National Register as part of a 1988 study of historic resources in the Mimbres Valley of Grant County.

References

Houses completed in 1895
Houses on the National Register of Historic Places in New Mexico
National Register of Historic Places in Grant County, New Mexico